Storås is an industrial area in Angered, in the northeast of Gothenburg. It has a tram stop, which is served by tram lines 4, 8 and 9. The next station to the south is underground, Hammarkullen

Gothenburg